Fred Mann may refer to:

 Fred Mann (baseball) (1858–1916), American center fielder in Major League Baseball
 Fred Mann (footballer) (1878–1970), Australian rules footballer